Ioan Nagy (also known as Ioan Naghi; born 8 November 1954) is a Romanian former football defender.

Honours
FCM Brașov
Divizia B: 1979–80, 1983–84

References

External links
Ioan Nagy player profile at Labtof.ro
Ioan Nagy manager profile 1 at Labtof.ro
Ioan Nagy manager profile 2 at Labtof.ro

1954 births
Living people
People from Bistrița-Năsăud County
Romanian footballers
Association football defenders
Liga I players
Liga II players
FC Brașov (1936) players
Romanian football managers
FC Brașov (1936) managers